Bilkhawthlir is a town in Kolasib District, Mizoram , India.

Demographics

As of the 2011 Census of India, Bilkhawthlir had a population of 5385 of which 2735 are males while 2650 are females. In Bilkhawthlir village population of children with age 0-6 is 908 which makes up 16.86% of total population of village. Average Sex Ratio of Bilkhawthlir village is 969 which is lower than Mizoram state average of 976. Child Sex Ratio for the Bilkhawthlir as per census is 1013, higher than Mizoram average of 970.

In 2011, literacy rate of Bilkhawthlir village was 90.31%. In Bilkhawthlir Male literacy stands at 90.11% while female literacy rate was 90.52%.

Administration
Bilkhawthlir is one of two the sitting place of Block Development Officer (BDO)in Kolasib District. Bilkhawthlir is divided into two village councils viz., Bilkhawthlir North and Bilkhawthlir South. The council members maintain their respective VC very well.

Besides the BDO, there are several other officers within the town:-

 Sub-Divisional Agriculture Officer (SDAO) & Agriculture Extension Officer (AEO)
 Sub-Divisional Officer (SDO), PWD, Highway Sub-Division
 Sub-Divisional Officer (SDO), PHED, WATSAN Sub-Division
 Sub-Divisional Officer (SDO), P&E, Building Sub-Division
 Child Development Project Officer (CDPO), ICDS Project
 Range Officer (RO), Environment  & Forest Dept.                    7. Medical Officer, Bilkhawthlir PHC.                               8. Fishery Extension Officer , Fisheries Dept.

Economy
Bilkhawthlir is agriculture-dominated economy with a few service sector jobs. A large number of people cultivate betel nut (areca nut), oil palms, rice, wheat and fish which is both consumed and exported to other parts of Mizoram. It is often known as "City of Betel Nut".

Transport
Bilkhawthlir can be reached by roadways as it is passed through by National Highway -54 (NH-54). It is 100 km away from Aizawl and about 60 km away from Silchar.

Tourist attraction

The scenic beauty of Bilkhawthlir attracts tourists. The beautiful Serlui B Dam and the forest around it is a nice place to visit for nature lover. Chemphai, a large paddy field along the town is also a breathtakingly beautiful and nice place to visit.

Education 
Schools and Institutions in Bilkhawthlir:

Entertainment

Bilkhawthlir Playground is the main venue of all big festivals and sports events in the town. Community Hall, Joint YMA Park and other places are also there for entertainment.

Media
Zoram Kanaan is the daily newspaper of Bilkhawthlir. There are two local cable network provider: Rodin Cable Network and Zote Vision.

References

External links
 Bilkhawthlir Official Website

Cities and towns in Kolasib district